Tinnheia nord is a neighbourhood in the city of Kristiansand in Agder county, Norway. It is located in the borough of Grim and in the district of Tinnheia. Tinnheia nord is north of Tinnheia torv.

References

Geography of Kristiansand
Neighbourhoods of Kristiansand